"Love Is Gonna Come at Last" is a song by the British power pop band Badfinger. Written by guitarist Joey Molland, "Love Is Gonna Come at Last" appeared on the band's 1979 album, Airwaves.

Release
"Love Is Gonna Come at Last" was first released on Airwaves, Badfinger's first album since original guitarist Pete Ham committed suicide in 1975. Despite its billing as Badfinger's "comeback album," it failed to make much of an impression on listeners, only hitting No. 125 in America. However, despite the failure of the album and its lead single, "Lost Inside Your Love," "Love Is Gonna Come at Last" was released as a single in 1979. Backed with the Tom Evans-penned "Sail Away" (also from Airwaves), the single was the only one from Airwaves to chart, reaching No. 69 on the Billboard Hot 100 in the United States. The single would prove to be the final Badfinger single to be released in Britain, and the penultimate one to chart (the final being "Hold On".)

Chart performance

Reception

Similarly to the other tracks on Airwaves, "Love Is Gonna Come at Last" received lukewarm reception.  Cash Box said it has a "moderate strumming beat, slide guitar fills and good singing" and "fine layered guitar work and upbeat feel." AllMusics Matthew Greenwald said on the song, "Another decent track from the Badfinger reunion album of 1977 on Elektra Records, 'Love Is Gonna Come at Last' is a fine effort. Although it ended up coming across as a recording that has all of the "dead" qualities of 1970s pop/arena rock, it's one of Joey Molland's finer efforts of the period, and certainly as good as fodder from such artists as Peter Frampton, who was vogue at the time." William Ruhlmann (also of AllMusic) said that the track "evokes their old mentors [The Beatles]."

Resources

Badfinger songs
Song recordings produced by David Malloy
1979 songs
Songs written by Joey Molland